The 2013 season was AIK's 122nd in existence, their 85th season in Allsvenskan and their 8th consecutive season in the league. The team competed in Allsvenskan and Svenska Cupen.

Season events

Preseason
On 8 November 2012, AIK announced the signing of Nabil Bahoui to a three-and-a-half-year contract from IF Brommapojkarna, starting on 1 January.

On 14 November 2012, AIK announced the signing of Kennedy Igboananike to a three-year contract from Djurgården, starting on 1 January.

April
On 3 April, AIK loaned Christian Kouakou to Mjällby, whilst Sal Jobarteh joined AFC Eskilstuna. 

On 5 April, AIK loaned Emil Skogh to Kongsvinger.

On 9 April, AIK loaned Oskar Cederling, Robin Palacios and Adam Bergkvist to Akropolis IF, whilst Adhavan Rajamohan joined on a permanent deal.

May
On 2 May, AIK's Croatian goalkeeper Ivan Turina died while sleeping in his apartment. His wife did not realize that he was dead until she woke up. He left one-year-old twins and his pregnant wife. Subsequently, all matches in Allsvenskan and Superettan honoured Turina with one minute of silence, and in most of the matches, the game will be stopped in the 27th minute for one minute's applause.

On 13 May, Turina's first professional club, Dinamo Zagreb, played a charity game against AIK at the Friends Arena, with all the money received during this game being given to Turina's family. The game was played in 2x27 minutes to honor Turina who wore number 27 while he played for AIK.

On 21 May, AIK announced the signing of Christian Frealdsson to a short-term contract.

June
On 15 June, Daniel Tjernström announced his retirement.

On 18 June, AIK announced that they had sold Viktor Lundberg to Randers.

July
On 2 July, AIK announced that they had sold Helgi Daníelsson to Belenenses.

On 4 July, Kwame Karikari extended his contract with AIK until the summer of 2015, whilst also moving to Balıkesirspor on a year-long loan deal with an option to make the move permanent. The following day, 5 July, Daniel Gustavsson joined Örebro on loan for the remainder of the season.

On 11 July, Christian Frealdsson left the club after his short-term contract came to an end, with Patrik Carlgren signing from IK Brage on a contract until the end of 2016.

On 24 July, AIK announced the signing of Ebenezer Ofori from New Edubiase United to a three-and-a-half-year contract, whilst Sal Jobarteh returned from his loan deal at AFC Eskilstuna, to join Dalkurd FF on loan for the remainder of the season. 

On 29 July, Lalawélé Atakora extended his contract with AIK until the summer of 2015, whilst also moving to Balıkesirspor on a year-long loan deal with an option to make the move permanent.

Squad

Transfers

In

Out

Loans out

Released

Friendlies

Competitions

Overview

Allsvenskan

League table

Results summary

Results by round

Results

Svenska Cupen

2012–13

Group stage

2013–14

Squad statistics

Appearances and goals

|-
|colspan="16"|Players away on loan:

|-
|colspan="16"|Players who appeared for AIK but left during the season:

|}

Goal scorers

Clean sheets

Disciplinary record

References

AIK Fotboll season
AIK Fotboll seasons